Onion Lake 119-2 is an Indian reserve of the Onion Lake Cree Nation in Saskatchewan. It is 37 kilometres west of St. Walburg.

References

Indian reserves in Saskatchewan